The 2000 Pontiac Excitement 400 was the 11th stock car race of the 2000 NASCAR Winston Cup Series and the 46th iteration of the event. The race was held on Saturday, May 6, 2000, in Richmond, Virginia, at Richmond International Raceway, a 0.75 miles (1.21 km) D-shaped oval. The race took the scheduled 400 laps to complete. At race's end, Dale Earnhardt Jr., driving for Dale Earnhardt, Inc., would hold onto the lead after making a four-tire call on the final round of pit stops to win his second career NASCAR Winston Cup Series win and his second and final win of the season. To fill out the podium, Terry Labonte of Hendrick Motorsports and Dale Jarrett of Robert Yates Racing would finish second and third, respectively.

Background 

Richmond International Raceway (RIR) is a 3/4-mile (1.2 km), D-shaped, asphalt race track located just outside Richmond, Virginia in Henrico County. It hosts the Monster Energy NASCAR Cup Series and Xfinity Series. Known as "America's premier short track", it formerly hosted a NASCAR Camping World Truck Series race, an IndyCar Series race, and two USAC sprint car races.

Entry list 

 (R) denotes rookie driver.

Practice

First practice 
The first practice session was held on Friday, May 5, at 12:30 PM EST, and would last for one hour and 25 minutes.

Second practice 
The second practice session was held on Friday, May 5, at 3:00 PM EST, and would last for one hour and 30 minutes.

Third practice 
The third practice session was held on Saturday, May 6, at 11:30 AM EST, and would last for one hour.

Fourth and final practice 
The fourth and final practice session, sometimes referred to as Happy Hour, was held on Saturday, May 6 after second-round qualifying, and lasted until 3:00 PM EST.

Qualifying 
Qualifying was split into two rounds. The first round was held on Friday, May 5, at 5:30 PM EST. Each driver would have two laps to set a fastest time; the fastest of the two would count as their official qualifying lap. During the first round, the top 25 drivers in the round would be guaranteed a starting spot in the race. If a driver was not able to guarantee a spot in the first round, they had the option to scrub their time from the first round and try and run a faster lap time in a second round qualifying run, held on Saturday, May 6, at 1:45 PM EST. As with the first round, each driver would have two laps to set a fastest time; the fastest of the two would count as their official qualifying lap. Positions 26-36 would be decided on time, while positions 37-43 would be based on provisionals. Six spots are awarded by the use of provisionals based on owner's points. The seventh is awarded to a past champion who has not otherwise qualified for the race. If no past champion needs the provisional, the next team in the owner points will be awarded a provisional.

Four drivers would fail to qualify: Rick Mast, Darrell Waltrip, Dave Marcis, and Ed Berrier.

Full qualifying results

Race results

References 

2000 NASCAR Winston Cup Series
NASCAR races at Richmond Raceway
May 2000 sports events in the United States
2000 in sports in Virginia